The 1936 Individual Speedway World Championship was the first ever Speedway World Championship and was won by Lionel Van Praag of Australia. It was the first of a record 26 times that London's Wembley Stadium would host the World Final with the last being in 1981.

Despite being unbeaten in the Final, Australian Bluey Wilkinson only finished third as the Championship was decided by bonus points accumulated in previous rounds plus the score from the final. Van Praag defeated England's Eric Langton in a runoff to be declared the inaugural Speedway World Champion.

As they lined up at the tapes for the runoff, Langton broke them which would ordinarily lead to disqualification. However, Van Praag stated he did not want to win the title by default and insisted that a race should take place. At the restart Langton made it to the first bend in front and led until the final bend on the last lap when Van Praag darted through the smallest of gaps to win by less than wheel length.

Afterwards, controversial allegations were abound that the two riders had 'fixed' the match race, deciding between them that the first person to the first bend would win the race and the Championship and split the prize money; Langton led into the first bend but was overtaken by Van Praag. Van Praag reportedly paid Langton £50 "conscience money" after the race for going back on the agreement.

1936 Podium
   Lionel Van Praag (Australia)
   Eric Langton (Great Britain)
   Bluey Wilkinson (Australia)

World final
10 September 1936
 London, Wembley Stadium

See also

References

1936
Individual World Championship
Individual Speedway World Championship
Individual Speedway World Championship
Speedway competitions in the United Kingdom